Rubén Ramírez Hidalgo and Santiago Ventura were the defending champions but decided not to participate.
Stefano Ianni and Simone Vagnozzi won the title, defeating Daniel Gimeno-Traver and Israel Sevilla 6–3, 6–4 in the final.

Seeds

Draw

Draw

References
 Main draw

Doubles